Katja Klepp (born 25 October 1967 in Erfurt) is a German sport shooter. She competed at the 1988 Summer Olympics in the women's 50 metre rifle three positions event, in which she placed fourth, and the women's 10 metre air rifle event, in which she placed 37th.

References

1967 births
Living people
ISSF rifle shooters
German female sport shooters
Shooters at the 1988 Summer Olympics
Olympic shooters of East Germany
Sportspeople from Erfurt